The 1991 OFC Men's Olympic Qualifying Tournament determined which Oceania Football Confederation (OFC) team would qualify for playoff with the 5th place team of the 1992 UEFA European Under-21 Championship to compete at the 1992 Summer Olympics men's football tournament.

Standings

Matches

References 

OFC Men's Olympic Qualifying Tournament